Marriage promotion is a policy aiming to produce "strong families" for the purposes of social security; as found in 21st-century American maternalism.

The George W. Bush Administration had focused on government marriage promotion as the solution to the high poverty rates experienced by single-parent families, diverting to marriage promotion tens of millions of dollars appropriated by Congress for other purposes, and successfully lobbying Congress to establish a federal marriage promotion program. These programs seek to get unmarried parents to marry and to deter separation or divorce.

United States politics
This promotion has its roots in the roots in the 1996 Welfare Reform Act. 

Childbirth with marriage is supported along with the marriage promotion as two people can raise a baby better than an unwed mother or father. Marriage was promoted in the 1990s in order to promote family values. Rising divorce rates in the 1980s and 1990s in addition to plummeting marriage rates, however, allowed then U.S. President George W. Bush to pass a nationwide marriage promotion law in the 2000s.

A major impetus behind marriage promotion is increasing father involvement. Low-income fathers are forced to take more responsibility for childrearing and their relationships with female partners. From a starting point of underfunded schools, poverty and family chaos, they often do poorly in school and drop out. Fathers are urged to marry the women they impregnate so that they can establish traditional families, according to the Alliance for Marriage.

Marriage promotion may also lead to discrimination against single-parent families that actually increases their poverty and hardship. Some marriage promotion supporters advocate promoting marriage by excluding single-parent families from some public benefits. Marriage promotion also teaches women to be dependent on a spouse instead of being economically independent.

One randomized controlled study reported that the most effective marriage promotion program simply provided assistance for job stability.

References

See also
 Bachelor tax
 Marriage
 Pro-natalism

Marriage
Public policy